() or  (Japanese ) may refer to:

Japan
Kita-ku, Hamamatsu
Kita-ku, Kobe
Kita-ku, Kumamoto
Kita-ku, Kyoto
Kita-ku, Nagoya
Kita-ku, Niigata
Kita-ku, Osaka
Kita-ku, Saitama
Kita-ku, Sakai
Kita-ku, Sapporo
Kita, Tokyo

South Korea
Buk-gu, Pohang
Buk District, Ulsan
Buk District, Busan
Buk District, Daegu
Buk District, Gwangju

Taiwan
North District, Hsinchu
North District, Taichung
North District, Tainan

Hong Kong
North District, Hong Kong

See also
Northern District (disambiguation)